Ships of the Indian Navy may refer to:

 List of active Indian Navy ships, list of commissioned ships of the Indian Navy
 List of ships of the Indian Navy, list of historical ships of the Indian Navy